The 1965 National Soccer League season was the forty-second season under the National Soccer League (NSL) name. The season began in early May and concluded in late October with Toronto Hakoah claiming their first NSL Championship by defeating reigning champions Toronto Ukrainia. Ukrainia successfully defended their regular-season title by finishing first in the standings. 

The league became once more restricted within the province of Ontario as both Montreal Cantalia, and Montreal Ukrainians departed. Despite the loss of the Montreal franchises, the league expanded beyond the Greater Toronto Area, and into the Northern Ontario, Kitchener-Waterloo, and Windsor markets.

Overview 
The creation of the Eastern Canada Professional Soccer League (ECPSL) in 1961 had a direct financial effect on the National Soccer League (NSL). The competition including the defection of the top NSL clubs to the ECPSL caused a major decrease in their match attendance throughout the early 1960s. Their drop in the gate earnings at Stanley Park Stadium contributed to their failure in fully paying their tax and loan payments. As their debt accumulated the city of Toronto threatened the league with seizure and foreclosure of Stanley Park Stadium. Fortunately, the NSL was given another year's extension by the Toronto Board of Control and managed to pay a portion of their debt off after the season. 

The average attendance number in Toronto remained low with the numbers ranging from 500-700 spectators. The league drew larger attendance numbers outside the Toronto area with Sudbury averaging the most with 1500 followed by Kitchener, and Windsor averaging about 1000. The league ceased being inter-provincial as Montreal Ukrainians joined the Quebec National Soccer League, and Montreal Cantalia attempted to rejoin the ECPSL. Though once more centered in Ontario the league expanded beyond the Greater Toronto Area and added Kitchener, Sudbury, and Windsor to the circuit.  

Toronto received further representation from the ethnic communities with the return of Toronto Hakoah, and the additions of Portuguese United, Toronto Azzurri, and Toronto Hellas. The Northern Ontario representative was the 1964 Ontario Cup champion Sudbury Italia, and the acceptance of Windsor Teutonia marked the return of professional soccer to the city of Windsor since the 1920s. The franchise rights to the Kitchener-Waterloo area were given to Kitchener Kickers, and Toronto Polonia ceased competing in the NSL.

Teams

Standings

Playoffs 
The preliminary round of the playoffs was contested in a round-robin style with two separate groups where the two group winners would qualify for the final. The championship final was contested in a best-of-three series.

Group A  

  
  
   
Toronto Ukrainia advances to the final.

Group B   

  
  
   
Toronto Hakoah advances to the final.

Finals

References

External links
RSSSF CNSL page
thecnsl.com - 1965 season

1965–66 domestic association football leagues
National Soccer League
1965